Rasmoyo (born 18 June 1978 in Magelang) is an Indonesian footballer.

Honours

Club honors
Arema Malang
Copa Indonesia (1): 2006

Persisam Putra Samarinda
Premier Division (1): 2008–09

References

External links

1978 births
Living people
Javanese people
People from Magelang
Association football defenders
Association football midfielders
Indonesian footballers
Liga 1 (Indonesia) players
PSS Sleman players
Persidafon Dafonsoro players
Persiba Balikpapan players
Persikab Bandung players
Arema F.C. players
Persema Malang players
Persela Lamongan players
Sportspeople from Central Java